Theron Winifred "T. C." Mortimer (May 27, 1872 – October 1, 1952) was an American football player and coach of football and baseball.  He served as the head football coach at the University of Colorado at Boulder in 1900 and at Alma College in 1901, compiling a career college football record of 9–6.  Mortimer was also the head baseball coach at Colorado in 1900, tallying a mark of 4–2.  Mortimer graduated from Simpson College in 1896 and played football as a tackle at the University of Chicago from 1896 to 1899.

Head coaching record

Football

References

1872 births
1952 deaths
19th-century players of American football
American football tackles
Alma Scots football coaches
Chicago Maroons football players
Colorado Buffaloes baseball coaches
Colorado Buffaloes football coaches
Simpson College alumni
People from Dallas County, Iowa
Coaches of American football from Iowa